Forton Heath is a hamlet in Shropshire, England. It is located north of Montford Bridge, near to the small village of Fitz and near to the hamlets of Broomfields, Mytton and Grafton. It is in the parish of Pimhill.

There is a large disused airfield here.

External links

Hamlets in Shropshire